This is a list of individual churches in England.  It is intended to include individual church buildings and/or congregations that are notable, including any notable by their listed building status.  Included are currently operating churches and also former churches.

These include:

By denomination
List of Anglo-Catholic churches in England
List of Methodist churches in England
List of Presbyterian churches in England

By region
List of churches in Allerdale
List of places of worship in Barrow-in-Furness
List of places of worship in Brighton and Hove
List of churches in Bristol
List of churches in Cambridge
List of churches in Cambridgeshire
List of churches in the City of Carlisle
List of churches in Cheshire
List of churches preserved by the Churches Conservation Trust in Southeast England
List of churches preserved by the Churches Conservation Trust in Southwest England
List of churches preserved by the Churches Conservation Trust in the East of England
List of churches preserved by the Churches Conservation Trust in the English Midlands
List of churches in Cornwall
List of Commissioners' churches in eastern England
List of Commissioners' churches in London
List of Commissioners' churches in Northeast and Northwest England
List of Commissioners' churches in southwest England
List of Commissioners' churches in the English Midlands
List of Commissioners' churches in Wales
List of Commissioners' churches in Yorkshire
List of churches in Copeland
List of churches in Cumbria
List of churches in East Cambridgeshire
List of places of worship in Eastbourne
List of churches in Eden District
List of English abbeys, priories and friaries serving as parish churches
List of places of worship in Epsom and Ewell
List of churches in Exeter
List of churches in Fenland
Friends of Friendless Churches
List of churches in Gloucestershire
List of churches in Greater Manchester
List of places of worship in the Borough of Guildford
List of churches in Hampshire
List of churches in Hartlepool
List of places of worship in Hastings
List of churches in Huntingdonshire
List of current places of worship on the Isle of Wight
List of churches in Kent
List of places of worship in the City of Leeds
List of places of worship in Lewes District
List of churches in Lincolnshire
List of churches in the Anglican Diocese of Leeds
List of churches in the Diocese of Carlisle
List of Roman Catholic churches in Leicester
List of churches in London
List of demolished churches in the City of London
List of churches destroyed in the Great Fire of London and not rebuilt
List of churches in Luton
List of churches in Mid Devon
List of churches in Milton Keynes
List of places of worship in Mole Valley
List of churches in North Devon
List of churches in Norwich
List of churches in Oxford
List of churches in Peterborough
List of churches in Plymouth
List of places of worship in Reigate and Banstead
List of places of worship in Rother
List of churches in Rutland
List of parishes in the Diocese of Salford
List of places of worship in Sevenoaks District
List of churches in South Cambridgeshire
List of churches in South Hams
List of churches in South Lakeland
List of places of worship in Tandridge District
List of churches in Teignbridge
List of Church of England churches in Thurrock
List of places of worship in Tonbridge and Malling
List of churches in Torbay
List of churches in Torridge
List of places of worship in Tunbridge Wells (borough)
List of places of worship in Waverley (borough)
List of current places of worship in Wealden
List of former places of worship in Wealden
List of churches in West Devon
List of places of worship in Woking (borough)
List of places of worship in Worthing
List of Christopher Wren churches in London
Medieval parish churches of York

By architect or architectural style
List of collegiate churches in England
List of church restorations, amendments and furniture by John Douglas
List of new churches by Temple Moore
List of new churches by Thomas Rickman
List of new ecclesiastical buildings by J. L. Pearson
List of new churches by Anthony Salvin
List of church restorations and alterations by Anthony Salvin
List of new churches by George Gilbert Scott in London
List of new churches by George Gilbert Scott in Northern England
List of new churches by George Gilbert Scott in South East England
List of new churches by George Gilbert Scott in South West England
List of new churches by George Gilbert Scott in the East of England
List of new churches by George Gilbert Scott in the English Midlands
List of new churches by G. E. Street
List of ecclesiastical works by Alfred Waterhouse